Uxue Iparragirre Larrañaga (born 12 March 2000) is a Spanish footballer who plays as a defender for Eibar.

Club career
Iparragirre started her career at Antzuola.

References

External links
Profile at La Liga

2000 births
Living people
Women's association football defenders
Spanish women's footballers
Sportspeople from Gipuzkoa
Footballers from the Basque Country (autonomous community)
SD Eibar Femenino players
Primera División (women) players
Segunda Federación (women) players
People from Debagoiena